St. Andrews International School may refer to several schools in Thailand:

 St Andrews International School Bangkok
 St. Andrews International School, Dusit
 St. Andrews International School, Rayong
 St. Andrews International School, Sukhumvit

See also
 Saint Andrews International High School, Malawi
 St. Andrew's School (disambiguation)